Walmer Lifeboat Station was established in 1830. Over two thousand ships are believed to have been wrecked on the Goodwin Sands, and the masts of several wrecks are visible from the shore at low tide. Hence there have always been two lifeboats located at the joined towns of Deal and Walmer along the coast opposite the sands.

History

1800–1939
In 1830, RNLI Gold Medals were awarded to Captain P Graham RN, Lieut HW Johnson RN and Lieut WS Watts RN, and a Silver Medal to John Durban for rescuing 13 crew from the ship Mountaineer and three other Deal boatmen on 24 November 1829. It was 26 years later however, in 1856, that an actual lifeboat station was established.

In 1896, crew member E Young drowned when he was trying to board the Steamship Trapian from the lifeboat. From 1912 to 1927 the station was closed, but when it re-opened the lifeboat was kept on a launching cradle at the head of the beach and soon afterwards, from 1930, the station had its first motor lifeboat.

World War One 

During World War I, Deal had two lifeboats, the RNLB Charles Dibdin and the RNLB Frances Forbes Barton; William Stanton was coxswain of the Frances Forbes Barton. In 1944 a Bronze Medal was awarded to Coxswain Joseph Mercer for rescuing 13 men from an anti-submarine boat stranded on the Goodwin Sands.

Postwar to present
Walmer's last all-weather lifeboat was the RNLB Hampshire Rose. The RNLB Hampshire Rose was retired from service on 5 May 1990 and, with the addition of a B-class  lifeboat (for whose launching rig the boathouse was then extended in 1992), Walmer was permanently established as an inshore lifeboat station. A new Atlantic 21, RNLB James Burgess (B-589), was placed on service in 1992. in the same year as a visit by the Queen Mother as Lord Warden of the Cinque Ports, and on 22 January 1997 a new D-class lifeboat, RNLB Lord Kitchener (D-514), was placed on service.

A new  lifeboat, RNLB Donald Mclauchlan (B-808), was put on station in December 2006, along with a new , RNLB Douggie Rodbard (D-663).

Fleet

All weather lifeboats

Inshore lifeboats

D-class

B-class

Station honours
At Walmer lifeboat station the following RNLI awards have been made:

Framed Letters of Thanks, six, including
1978, to Coxswain Bruce Brown and Second Coxswain Cyril Williams for refloating the vessel Elmela off the Goodwin Sands. 
1985, to Helmsman Anthony Evans for rescuing two men who were cut off by the tide after their canoe had capsized.
1991, to crew members John Collins and Shaun East for the Josse rescue.
Thanks of the Institution Inscribed on Vellum, ten, including
1969, to Helmsman Bruce Brown and Crew Members Cyril Williams and John Riley for rescuing four people cut off by the tide.
1970. Along with the Ralph Glister Award, to Helmsman Cyril Williams and Crew Members Leslie Coe and Charles Taylor for rescuing two men cut off by the tide in a cave. 
1972, to Coxswain Henry Brown for saving the yacht Nell and her six crew, plus a cat. 
1991 to Helmsman Duane Brown for rescuing the three crew from the yacht Josse aground on Goodwin Sands. 
2002 to Helmsman Andrew Coe, Adam Cowell and Philip Brenchly for the rescue of the 32 ft yacht Thai Thai off the Goodwin Sands.
Bronze Medals, four, including
1977, to Coxswain Bruce Brown for rescuing the four crew from the sinking cabin cruiser Shark, along with the Second Coxswain who had become trapped in the cabin. Also awarded to Pat Hardman, who, with the aid of Bruce Brown was able to rescue Cyril Williams and the four crew of the ship.
Silver Medals, four, including
1859, to John Moss for saving one man from the tender of the lugger Stornoway on 19 December 1858.
1948, to Coxswain Frederick Upton and Bronze Medal to Mechanic Cecil Cavell for rescuing 30 men, including two stowaways, and a dog from the steamer Silvia Onorato aground on the Goodwin Sands. The lifeboat spent 45 hours at sea. The Maud Smith Award for the bravest act of lifesaving in 1948 was awarded to Coxswain Upton.
1952, to Coxswain Frederick Upton and Bronze Medal to Mechanic Cecil Cavell for rescuing 38 men from the wreck of the steamer Agen that was aground on the South Goodwin bank, close to three other wrecks from which the Walmer lifeboat had rescued 115 people over the previous six years.
Gold Medals, three
In 1997 a special award went to Pat Hardman, for his 27½ years of volunteer work for the RNLI in Deal, in which time he saved 119 lives from shipwreck.
In 2005 a special award went to Les Coe, for his 50 years of volunteer work for Walmer Lifeboat during which time he served as a crew member and Head Launcher. He continues to work for the RNLI at Boathouse Manager at Walmer.

References

External links

lifeboat station homepage

Lifeboat stations in Kent